Desmond Gerard Higgins is a Professor of Bioinformatics at University College Dublin, widely known for CLUSTAL, a series of computer programs for performing multiple sequence alignment. According to Nature, Higgins' papers describing CLUSTAL are among the top ten most highly cited scientific papers of all time.

Education
Higgins was educated at Trinity College, Dublin where he was awarded a PhD in 1988 for research on numerical taxonomy of Pterygote insects.

Research
Research in the Higgins laboratory focusses on developing new bioinformatics and statistical tools for evolutionary biology. The CLUSTAL  program for multiple sequence alignment has been developed in the Higgins lab and the T-Coffee software was initially developed in the lab with by Cedric Notredame. Multivariate statistics are used to analyse microarray data sets and molecular evolution such as the evolution of promoters, introns and non-coding RNA.

Awards and honours
Higgins was elected a Fellow of the International Society for Computational Biology (ISCB) in 2015. He was awarded the Kimura Motoo Award in 2016 for his contributions to the advancement of evolutionary biology and molecular phylogeny. In 2018, Higgins received the Benjamin Franklin Award for open access in the life sciences.

References

Irish bioinformaticians
Living people
Fellows of the International Society for Computational Biology
1959 births
Academics of University College Dublin